The following lists events in the year 2022 in Guatemala.

Incumbents 

 President:Alejandro Eduardo Giammattei Falla (since 2020)
 Vice-President: César Guillermo Castillo Reyes (since 2020)

Events 

Ongoing – COVID-19 pandemic in Guatemala

 July 9 – Guatemala puts 66 of its municipalities on alert due to a sharp increase in the number of COVID-19 cases.
 July 30 – One person is wounded in an assassination attempt on President of Guatemala Alejandro Giammattei. The president is unharmed.

Sports 

 August 2021 - May 2022: 2021–22 Liga Nacional de Guatemala
 July 2022 - May 2023: 2022–23 Liga Nacional de Guatemala

Deaths 

 January 6 – Rómulo Méndez, 83, football referee
 February 17 – Gerardo Humberto Flores Reyes, 96, Roman Catholic prelate, bishop of Verapaz (1971–2001)
 February 24 – Roberto Carpio, 91, politician, vice president (1986–1991)
 March 14 – José Ramiro Pellecer Samayoa, 92, Roman Catholic prelate, auxiliary bishop of Guatemala (1967–2010)

See also 

COVID-19 pandemic in North America
 2020s
 2020s in political history
2022 Atlantic hurricane season

References

External links 

 13 young Guatemalans who left for a better future were slain in Mexico, families say (by Kate Linthicum & Jeff Abbott, January 30, 2021, Los Angeles Times

 
2020s in Guatemala
Years of the 21st century in Guatemala
Guatemala
Guatemala